Sir Charles Anthony King-Harman  (26 April 1851 – 17 April 1939) was a British colonial administrator.

King-Harman was the son of Hon. Lawrence Harman King-Harman, the son of Robert King, 1st Viscount Lorton, and Mary Cecilia Johnstone. He was the younger brother of the politician Edward King-Harman.

He was educated at the University of Cambridge and entered the Colonial Service in 1874. He served in the Bahamas, Cyprus and Barbados before working as Colonial Secretary in Mauritius between 1893 and 1897. He was invested as a Companion of the Order of St Michael and St George in 1893. He was administrator of Saint Lucia from 1897 to 1900, before serving as Governor of Sierra Leone from 1900 to 1904. He was invested as a Knight Commander of the Order of St Michael and St George in 1900. He was High Commissioner of Cyprus between 1904 and 1911, and was the representative of the Mediterranean colonies at the coronation of George V in 1911.

He married Constance Biddulph, daughter of General Sir Robert Biddulph and Sophia Lambert, on 12 July 1888.

References

1851 births
1939 deaths
Alumni of the University of Cambridge
Colonial Service officers
Governors of British Cyprus
Governors of Sierra Leone
Charles
Knights Commander of the Order of St Michael and St George
Colonial Secretaries of Mauritius
Colony of the Bahamas people
British Cyprus people
Colony of Barbados people
Governors of British Saint Lucia
High Commissioners of the United Kingdom to Cyprus